Richard John Arculus is an Australian petrologist and volcanologist, formerly a professor of the School of Earth Sciences at the Australian National University. His research interests and areas of expertise include inorganic geochemistry, igneous petrology, metamorphic petrology, volcanology, and chemical oceanography.

Arculus graduated with a first-class degree in Geology from Durham University in 1970. He then earned a PhD from the same institution in 1973. Following his time at Durham he was a post-doctoral fellow of the Carnegie Institution for Science.

Career
Through the 70s, 80s, and early 90s he held academic positions in the United States at Rice University and the University of Michigan, before moving to Australia to work at the University of New England.

Arculus joined ANU as a full professor in 1994. He successfully campaigned for Australia to join the Integrated Ocean Drilling Program and subsequently participated in a number of research voyages on board the RV Franklin and RV Southern Surveyor. He returned to Durham in October 2009, where he was a fellow at the Institute of Advanced Study through December. In 2017 he argued that volcanic eruptions could take place in Melbourne or Auckland and suggested that volcanic eruptions may have contributed to the outbreak of war in ancient Egypt.

Bibliography
Volcanic Arc Systems (Cambridge University Press, 2008)

References

Year of birth missing (living people)
Living people
Fellows of the Institute of Advanced Study (Durham)
Australian geologists
Australian volcanologists
Australian scientists
Alumni of Hatfield College, Durham